Atheist's Cornea is the sixth album from Japanese post-hardcore band Envy. Atheist's Cornea is Envy's shortest full-length release since 1998's From Here to Eternity and continues along the artistic path set by their preceding record Recitation. It is the last Envy release to feature founding guitarist Masahiro Tobita and founding drummer Dairoku Seki.

Track listing

Personnel
Dairoku Seki - drums
Tetsuya Fukagawa - sequencer, vocals
Nobukata Kawai - guitar
Masahiro Tobita - guitar
Manabu Nakagawa - bass guitar

References

2015 albums
Envy (band) albums